General elections are scheduled to take place on 14 May 2023. President Erdoğan had previously signalled that the election will be held early on 14 May 2023, a reference to the 1950 election that ended Turkey's one party regime. Presidential elections are held to elect the President of Turkey using a two-round system. Simultaneously, parliamentary elections are held to elect 600 Members of Parliament to the Grand National Assembly of Turkey.

Background

The previous Turkish general election took place in 2018. The election marked the country's transition from a parliamentary system to a presidential one, as narrowly endorsed by voters in the 2017 constitutional referendum. That election resulted in a victory for incumbent president Recep Tayyip Erdoğan, who had held the position since 2014. Meanwhile, the ruling Justice and Development Party (AK Party) lost its absolute majority in the Grand National Assembly of Turkey for the first time since June 2015, forcing it to rely on its coalition partner, the Nationalist Movement Party (MHP) of Devlet Bahçeli, to pass legislation. The office of the Prime Minister of Turkey was abolished on 12 July 2018, and its last holder, Binali Yıldırım, took office as the Speaker of the Grand National Assembly.

Although there were speculations about a snap election prior to the regular one in 2023, Bahçeli ruled them out. In a written statement, he said that elections would not be held before 2023. He also confirmed that the current coalition between AK Party and MHP will remain intact and Erdoğan will be their joint nominee for President. On 9 June 2022, Erdoğan declared his candidacy. on 22 January 2023 President Erdogan announced he would initiate snap elections 10 March which would bring the election date forward from 18 June to 14 May. However, the impact of the devastating Turkey–Syria earthquake on voter’s opinions is not yet known.

At least one party has been blocked from standing in the election despite a court ruling in its favour.

Presidential election

Declared 

 Recep Tayyip Erdoğan, 12th President of Turkey (2014–present), 25th Prime Minister of Turkey (2003–2014), Mayor of Istanbul (1994–1998)
 Kemal Kılıçdaroğlu, leader of Republican People's Party, leader of the opposition
 Cem Uzan, former leader of the Young Party (GP)
 Muharrem İnce, leader of the Homeland Party, former CHP candidate for president in 2018
 Sinan Oğan, former member of the parliament from MHP (2011–2015) (running as Independent)
 Doğu Perinçek, leader of Patriotic Party, candidate for president in 2018

Parliamentary election

Contesting parties which entered the parliament in the last election

See also
 List of elections in 2023
 Opinion polling for the 2023 Turkish general election

References

 
General elections in Turkey
Turkey
Turkey
Future elections in Turkey